The men's 50 metre freestyle competition at the 1993 Pan Pacific Swimming Championships took place on August 15 at the Port Island Sports Center.  The last champion was Tom Jager of US.

This race consisted of one length of the pool in freestyle.

Records
Prior to this competition, the existing world and Pan Pacific records were as follows:

Results
All times are in minutes and seconds.

Heats
The first round was held on August 15.

B Final 
The B final was held on August 15.

A Final 
The A final was held on August 15.

References

1993 Pan Pacific Swimming Championships